is a town located in Iburi Subprefecture, Hokkaido, Japan.

, the town has an estimated population of 2,665, and a density of 13 persons per km2. The total area is 205.04 km2.

It is home of the Showa Shinzan Yukigassen Tournament, a major Japanese snowball fight tournament.

Notable people from Sōbetsu
Kitanoumi Toshimitsu, sumo wrestler

External links

Official Website 

Towns in Hokkaido